Brestovac (Serbo-Croatian for "Elm tree") may refer to:

Brestovac, Croatia, a village and a municipality in Požega-Slavonia County
Brestovac, Bojnik, Serbia
Brestovac, Bor, Serbia
Brestovac, Knić, Serbia
Brestovac, Leskovac, Serbia
Brestovac, Negotin, Serbia
Bački Brestovac, Serbia
Banatski Brestovac, Serbia
Brestovac, Orahovac, Kosovo
Brestovac, Bosanski Petrovac, Bosnia and Herzegovina
Daruvarski Brestovac, Croatia
Garešnički Brestovac, Croatia
Brestovăț, Romania

See also
Brestova
Brestovo (disambiguation)
Brestovik